Azmi v Kirklees Metropolitan Borough Council [2007] IRLR 434 (EAT) is a UK labour law case, concerning indirect discrimination on grounds of religion. The United Kingdom Employment Appeals Tribunal in London (EAT) dismissed the appeal in respect of discrimination and/or harassment, but awarded £1,100 to the plaintiff for victimisation, uprated by 10% as a result of the LEA's having failed to follow the statutory grievance protocol.

Facts
Aishah Azmi, a graduate (in English and Arabic) from Leeds University, was employed as a bi-lingual support worker at Headfield Church of England (Controlled) Junior School, Thornhill Lees, Dewsbury, West Yorkshire (where 92% of the students were Muslim), claimed constructive unfair dismissal for religious discrimination, because the school refused to allow her to wear a niqab that covered her entire face except her eyes as she worked with male colleagues and schoolchildren. The Employment Appeal Tribunal stated the following fact summary.

After Azmi requested to be able to wear the veil the school and the local authority allowed her to wear the niqab temporarily outdoors in school grounds, but was concerned that many male colleagues were necessarily in the classrooms. They investigated whether wearing the niqab was compatible with doing her job, but ultimately found in a report "Gesture and body language including facial expression reinforce the spoken word" and noted Azmi's "lovely friend smiling manner with the children and how they responded well to this" but that children could not respond to her teaching so well when her face was concealed. Accordingly, they concluded that Azmi could not continue working if she kept the niqab. Between November and February Azmi took time off and it was agreed to resolve the issue in the Tribunal.

The Employment Tribunal dismissed Azmi's claims for direct and indirect religious discrimination and harassment but found that she had been victimised for complaining, and awarded £1000, increased by 10% for the local authority's failure to follow the statutory grievance procedure. Azmi appealed the finding on direct and indirect discrimination and harassment. She was subsequently dismissed by Kirklees Council in February 2006. She lodged papers with the Employment Appeals Tribunal in London, although she was publicly advised by her MP Shahid Malik to drop the case, since 'there is no real support for it'. Azmi's legal representative was Nick Whittingham of Kirklees Law Centre, and barrister Declan O'Dempsey of Cloisters Chambers represented her during her appeal, heard in 2007.

Judgment
Wilkie J in the Employment Appeal Tribunal held that there was no direct or indirect discrimination or harassment. He found the Tribunal's conclusion that another non-Muslim person covering their face for whatever reason would have been dismissed as well would have been treated the same, and so there was no direct discrimination. On the claim for indirect discrimination, he said the following:

See also

 Islam in the United Kingdom
 Islamic dress controversy in Europe
 French law on secularity and conspicuous religious symbols in schools

Notes

References

External links
Azmi interviewed about the case on the BBC

United Kingdom labour case law
Employment Appeal Tribunal cases
2007 in case law
Religious discrimination
2007 in religion
2007 in British law
Islam in England
Anti-discrimination law in the United Kingdom